Manuel Tovar Siles (born 10 August 1875 in Granada - 10 April 1935) was a Spanish cartoonist and caricaturist. In addition to "Tovar", he also signed with the pseudonym "Don Hermógenes".

Biography 
Manuel Tovar was self-taught and was influenced by the artist Ramón Cilla. Despite of some early collaborations for magazines in Valencia and Barcelona, he soon moved to Madrid. Tovar drew caricature portraits, political satire, and costumbrismo. He also worked in oil and watercolor painting, though he was less well known in those techniques. His illustrations were published in periodicals like Madrid Cómico, Gedeón, La Correspondencia de Españan, El Liberal, ABC, El Sol, La Voz, La Esfera, Blanco y Negro, Nuevo Mundo, Mundo Gráfico, Buen Humor, El Imparcial, La Hoja de Parra, Gutiérrez, La Risa, ¡Oiga usted...!, Heraldo de Madrid, España Nueva, La Bandera Federal and Don Quijote, .

Personal life 
He married Concepción Rodríguez and had two children, Manuel and Conchita. Tovar is buried in the cemetery of La Almudena.

Legacy 
Tovar was described by Mariano Sánchez de Palacios as "one of the most representative figures of the journalistic Madrid of the first quarter-century". The newspaper La Libertad tagged him as "the most popular cartoonist in Madrid".

References

Bibliography

External links 

Spanish caricaturists
1935 deaths
People from Granada
1875 births